Paralepetopsis ferrugivora is a species of sea snail, a true limpet, a marine gastropod mollusk in the family Neolepetopsidae, one of the families of true limpets.

Description
The largest reported specimen was 9.2 mm in diameter.

Habitat
The species is normally found in deep-sea hydrothermal vents and seeps. They have been found in the Mid-Atlantic Ridge. They can survive in water from 2.52–4.96 degrees Celsius, and at depths from 1,620–3,500 feet.

References

External links

Neolepetopsidae
Gastropods described in 2001